G.K.Singh Dhaliwal (born 17 June 1957) is an Indian civil servant who currently serves as Director, Department of Rural Development and Panchayats for the state of Punjab, India. He is a 1986 batch officer of the Punjab Civil Services, was later promoted to Indian Administrative Service in 2001.
He is also the founder of an NGO, Village Development Council, Jalwana, involved in the integrated development of backward areas of Punjab. He is also the founder member of Sarbat Da Bhala Charitable Trust, instrumental in rehabilitation of disabled and bringing back Punjabi youth languishing in jails abroad.

Early life and education 

G.K.Singh was born to Sukhdev Singh Dhaliwal and Mata Gurdial Kaur in village Jalwana, District Sangrur. He received his primary education in Government Primary School, village Lohatbaddi. He enrolled at Government Rajindra College, Bathinda for his higher studies. He later joined Punjabi University, Patiala with Political Sciences as his major subject in Honors School. He became the youngest gold medallist at the age of 20 years 6 months in the history of the university.

Personal life 

He married Neel Kamal Brar in 1988 in Bathinda. He has two sons Rohan Bir and Kanwar Partap.

Teaching career 
He was appointed as a lecturer in this specialization field of International Politics by the Government of Punjab before he completed his master's degree in 1978 at an age of 21 years. He taught post graduate students in Government College, Sri Mukatsar Sahib, Patran (Patiala) and Malerkotla before quitting his job on being appointed as an officer in the Punjab Civil Services in 1986. He is invited to various universities and schools to give lectures about topics concerning various social issues.

Punjab Civil Services and Indian Administrative Services 

He was selected as an officer in the Punjab Civil Services (Executive Branch) after clearing the Punjab Public Service Commission exam. After completion of his training he was appointed Executive Magistrate, Bathinda. He later held the position of GA to DC, Faridkot. He was posted as district transport officer, Bathinda from 1991 to 1993 and regional transport authority from 1994 to 1996. During the latter stint, he was instrumental in organizing the annual Road Safety Awareness Week. He joined as the Additional Deputy Commissioner (Development) in April 1996. He also served Departments of school education as Joint Secretary. He was appointed Additional Deputy Commissioner, Sangrur for a period of three years from 1999 till 2001. He also held the post of District Census Officer for 2001 Census Operations. He was awarded the President of India's silver medal for the same. He was promoted to the Indian Administrative Services with the batch of 2001. He was posted as Director, Colonization, Punjab. He joined as the Deputy Commissioner, District of Rupnagar on 5 April 2011. During his tenure there he was instrumental in improving sanitation and greenery in the city as well as district. He was instrumental in stopping illegal sand mining in the area. He also played in conducting free and fair elections for state assembly in 2012. He was later given the charge of the Deputy Commissioner of District of Patiala in 2012. After a two-year stint in Patiala, he was posted as Director General School Education, Punjab looking after the primary, middle and high school education in the state. As DGSE, Punjab he laid emphasis on student safety and took steps to prevent child abuse. He also banned phubbing by teachers during school hours. He also initiated setting up of helpline to redress the public grievances related to the Department of School Education. He was instrumental in setting up the anti-Drug Awareness Campaign in school across the state. He started the "Sohna School Campaign" and was instrumental in setting up toilets for students in all government schools as a part of the same. On 25 December 2014 he was given the charge of Commissioner, Municipal Corporation, Ludhiana. He laid emphasis on promoting Swachh Bharat Abhiyaan improving the green belt and people's participation on joining his new assignment. During his tenure, Ludhiana was chosen as one of the 20 cities and the only city from Punjab for the implementation of Smart City Project by the Ministry of Urban Development, Housing and Urban Poverty Alleviation, Government of India. As the Commissioner of Municipal Corporation in Ludhiana, he was instrumental in establishing the public library at Guru Nanak Bhawan, upgrading the two landmark greenbelts, Rakh Bagh and Rose Garden. He reopened the children's library in Ludhiana after a period of 16 years. During his tenure in Ludhiana, the city moved to rank 34 from rank 381 in the Swachh Bharat Abhiyaan rankings. He was deputed as Director, Rural Development and Panchayats, for the state of Punjab in August 2016. He initiated scoring and honouring system for best Panchayats in the state on every Independence Day.

Awards and honors

 President of India Silver Medal for Census Operations, 2001
 Commendation Certificate by the House of Commons, Canada by MP Hon.Gurbax Singh Malhi
 Certificate of Honor by Ms.Susan Fenell Mayor of Brampton, Canada.
 Certificate of Honor by the Legislative Assembly of Alberta by MPP Mr.Darshan Kang
 Certificate of Honor by the Legislative Assembly of British Columbia

Village Development Council 

The residents of village Jalwana under his leadership, along with the support of diaspora, founded the Village Development Council on 13 April 1999. 
In the very first gathering of the village, a target was set to make it a model village by achieving the following 8 targets:
 Construction of the village periphery road having a length of 1.25 km.
 Redesigning the water drains and connecting them to Tallewal drain
 Construction of a modern Old Age Home for village elders
 Developing the village cremation ground.
 Street lighting of all village streets and periphery roads and ensuring 24hour electricity supply
 Building up of peaceful mutual brotherhood conducive to development of entire village
 Providing a strong financial support to brilliant students for higher studies.
 Steps towards mutual co-operation for removal of unemployment.

Within a year the council was successful in achieving 6 of the above given targets. While carrying out these developments of projects the people's participation in all the activities was a great example for the surrounding areas.
They not only contributed in terms of money but physically participated in all these activities. Whether it was the construction of village circular road, redesigning of village drains, development of village cremation ground and construction of mourners' shed or planting ornamental trees on the periphery of the village. It was the mutual co-operation and peoples participation which provided strength to their efforts and created an environment of mutual brotherhood in the village.

The honour of being the first village in the district having total street lights goes to this village. The periphery and streets of the village have been provided with halogen lamps and electric tubes. The villagers also think that not only darkness of streets is removed but also going to remove darkness from their hearts-the darkness of illiteracy, social evils etc.
It is important to mention here that very rare Criminal Case has been reported in the last 15 years from the village.

The Governor of Punjab His Excellency Gen.J.F.R.Jacob declared it a "Millennium Village" on his maiden visit to the place.

Columnist 

He is a regular columnist for leading Punjabi newspapers in India and Canada namely Gurmat Parkash, Punjabi Tribune, Daily Ajit, Indo Canadian Times, Desh Sewak, Desh Videsh Times on various social issues plaguing Punjab. He has presented talks on All India Radio, Jalandhar, Red FM, Surrey B.C. As the Deputy Commissioner, Patiala and the ex-officio chairman of the District Child Welfare Council, he launched the magazine, "Balpreet", consisting of contributions by the school children and is circulated in all government and private schools. He is also the advisor and founder member of "Saade Pind" magazine published by the Department of Rural Development and Panchayats, Govt. of Punjab, consisting of articles to enlighten farmers about the latest farming practices and overall rural development. His articles and literature about Sikhism has been cited multiple times by the Head Granthi of Sri Harimandir Sahib during the katha of the Daily Hukamnama from Sri Manji Sahib.

References 

G.K.Singh
1957 births
People from Ludhiana district
Living people